Xiao Jiang (born 1972) is the stage name of female Chinese film director Jia Yan,. Jia graduated from the Beijing Film Academy in 1995. Jia Yan worked primarily in television, directing three TV movies before joining the China Film Group as a screenwriter. In 2004, under the name of Xiao Jiang, she wrote and directed her debut film, Electric Shadows.

Filmography

References

External links
 
 

Chinese screenwriters
Chinese women film directors
1972 births
Living people
Beijing Film Academy alumni